Local is a twelve-part Oni Press comic book limited series written by Brian Wood and illustrated by Ryan Kelly.

Each issue is intended to be a stand-alone short story, taking place in a different town across North America. A recurring character, Megan, provides a thread for readers who follow the series in sequence. Megan is the main character in some issues, while in others she is a spectator or background figure.

Local resembles a previous series of Wood's, Demo (published by AiT/Planet Lar), which also spanned twelve issues, each of which was a self-contained story. As Local went on, it became more of a coming of age story for the lead character.

The first issue was released in November 2005, and the series concluded in June 2008.

Issues
 "Ten Thousand Thoughts Per Second" - Portland, Oregon
 "Polaroid Boyfriend" - Minneapolis, Minnesota
 "Theories and Defenses" - Richmond, Virginia
 "Two Brothers" - Missoula, Montana
 "The Last 10 Lonely Days at the Oxford Theatre" - Halifax, Nova Scotia
 "Megan and Gloria, Apartment 5A" - Brooklyn, New York
 "Hazardous Youth" - Tempe, Arizona
 "Food as Substitute" - Wicker Park, Chicago
 "Wish You Were Here" - Norman, Oklahoma
 "Bar Crawl" - Austin, Texas
 "The Younger Generation" - Toronto, Ontario
 "The House That Megan Built" - Vermont

References

External links
Local Blog
Podcast interview with Brian Wood about Local at comiXology

2005 comics debuts